Lady Ann Strait is a waterway in Jones Sound in the Canadian territory of Nunavut. The strait empties into northwestern Baffin Bay.

References

 Lady Ann Strait at the Atlas of Canada.

External links
 The Polynya in Lady Ann Strait, Jones Sound, NW Baffin Bay, Arctic Canada: A Time-lapse movie of RADARSAT images, 1998

Straits of Qikiqtaaluk Region
Bodies of water of Baffin Bay